Nandakumar, better known as Poster Nandakumar (born August 26, 1967) is an Indian actor, producer and poster distributor, who has worked in Tamil language films. He made a breakthrough as an actor with his performances in Madras (2014) and Vil Ambu (2016), while also serving as the producer in the latter.

Career
Nandakumar runs Chennai's biggest film poster distribution service and heads up the family business which began in the 1950s. In 2013, Nandakumar was also involved in the pre-production of Pandiraj's Idhu Namma Aalu (2016) and was set to produce the film before T. Rajender asked to take over the venture. When visiting Studio Green's office to discuss the distribution of film posters, Nandakumar was spotted by director Pa. Ranjith, who requested him to work as an actor in the film, Madras (2014). After initial reluctance, Nandakumar agreed and the film subsequently went on to perform well at the box office, bringing Nandakumar further offers and the SIIMA Award for Best Actor in a Negative Role. Nandakumar later went on to produce and act in the film, Vil Ambu (2016), directed by Ramesh Subramaniam.

He has worked in Rajinikanth-starrer Kabali (2016), Nibunan (2016) and Rukkumani Vandi Varudhu (2016).

Filmography

References

External links

Living people
Male actors in Tamil cinema
21st-century Indian male actors
1967 births